Onkologia i Radioterapia (English: Oncology and Radiotherapy) is a monthly peer-reviewed open-access medical journal covering oncology and radiology published by Medical Project Poland. The editor-in-chief is Ludmila Grzybowska-Szatkowska (Medical University of Lublin). The journal was established in 2007 and is an official journal of the Polish Oncological Society, Polish Oncology Radiotherapy Society, and the Oncology Orthopedics Section of the Polish Orthopedic and Traumatological Society.

Abstracting and indexing
The journal is abstracted and indexed in Embase and Scopus.

References

External links
 

Oncology journals
Radiology and medical imaging journals
Monthly journals
Publications established in 2007
English-language journals
Open access journals